Mary Parr (born 1 October 1961) is an Irish hurdler. She competed in the women's 400 metres hurdles at the 1984 Summer Olympics.

References

1961 births
Living people
Athletes (track and field) at the 1984 Summer Olympics
Irish female hurdlers
Olympic athletes of Ireland
Place of birth missing (living people)